Louisiana Highway 22 (LA 22) is a state highway located in southeastern Louisiana.  It runs  in a general east–west direction from the junction of LA 75 and LA 942 in Darrow to U.S. Highway 190 (US 190) in Mandeville.

The route traverses a variety of terrain and surroundings over the course of its journey, which begins at the Mississippi River in rural Ascension Parish.  It also crosses several navigable waterways with movable bridges spanning two of them: the Amite River and Tchefuncte River.  After crossing both Interstate 10 (I-10) and US 61 in Sorrento, LA 22 winds through a cypress swamp in Livingston Parish west of Lake Maurepas.

Near the town of Springfield, the highway enters the thick pine forest characterizing the north shore of Lake Pontchartrain and intersects the concurrent I-55/US 51 in Ponchatoula.  On its east end, LA 22 becomes a heavily traveled residential and commercial corridor in suburban St. Tammany Parish between Madisonville and Mandeville.  This stretch runs south of the parallel I-12 corridor and feeds traffic onto US 190 and the Lake Pontchartrain Causeway to the New Orleans area.

LA 22 was designated in the 1955 Louisiana Highway renumbering, replacing portions of five shorter former routes.  These included State Route 761, State Route 54, State Route 160, State Route 122, and State Route 465.  In its early years, LA 22 extended across the Mississippi River by ferry to Donaldsonville prior to the existence of the nearby Sunshine Bridge.  The route was also much shorter on its eastern end, terminating at a junction with US 51 and US 190 in Ponchatoula until the latter was re-routed through Covington.

Route description

Darrow to Sorrento
From the west, LA 22 begins at a junction with LA 75 and LA 942 at the east bank levee of the Mississippi River opposite the city of Donaldsonville.  The route heads northeast from the small Ascension Parish community of Darrow as an undivided two-lane highway, traveling through Hillaryville across the Canadian National Railway (CN) line and to the rear of Houmas House Plantation and Gardens.  In Burnside, LA 22 intersects LA 44 and passes through a growing suburban area amidst the rural surroundings.

Entering the town of Sorrento, the highway intersects LA 70, which leads across the Sunshine Bridge to Donaldsonville.  Shortly afterward, LA 22 widens to a divided four-lane highway and passes through a diamond interchange with I-10 at exit 182, connecting with Baton Rouge and New Orleans.  LA 22 continues along John Leblanc Boulevard, which largely bypasses the populated portion of the town.  The highway crosses the Kansas City Southern Railway (KCS) line, followed closely by US 61 (Airline Highway), which parallels the interstate between the aforementioned cities.

Sorrento to Lake Maurepas swamp
Narrowing back to two-lane capacity, LA 22 proceeds north from Sorrento to a T-intersection with LA 429 just east of St. Amant.  It then turns due east briefly through an area known as Acy.  Resuming its northeastern trajectory, LA 22 begins to wind its way through the swampland that surrounds Lake Maurepas.  The highway crosses a bridge over the wide Amite River Diversion Canal, which is lined by boat houses and fishing camps.

Continuing into Livingston Parish, LA 22 turns eastward at a T-intersection marking the terminus of LA 16 south of French Settlement.  LA 16 leads to Denham Springs and Walker, the most populated areas of the parish, located along I-12.  LA 22 follows a serpentine path through several small communities along the Amite River, such as Head of Island, Whitehall, and Maurepas.  Curving again to the northeast, LA 22 crosses the river via swing bridge and passes through Killian, located at a junction with LA 444.  The route then proceeds across a higher and longer bridge spanning the Tickfaw River, allowing a splendid view of the surrounding cypress swamp.

Springfield and Ponchatoula
Entering the small town of Springfield, LA 22 turns northwest briefly at a T-intersection with LA 1037 (Collum Road).  The two routes proceed along the town's main street in a wrong-way concurrency until reaching Walnut Street.  From this four-way intersection, LA 1037 turns west toward Tickfaw State Park, LA 42 begins and proceeds along the main street, while LA 22 turns east across the Natalbany River into Tangipahoa Parish.

Immediately across the parish line, LA 22 intersects LA 1249, which heads north through Pumpkin Center to a junction with I-12. With the terrain having transitioned from swampland to pine forest, the surroundings become more consistently populated as LA 22 heads into the small city of Ponchatoula. On the outskirts of town, LA 22 widens to four lanes as it passes through a full cloverleaf interchange with the concurrent I-55/US 51, connecting with the larger nearby city of Hammond, as well as New Orleans.

Just east of the interchange, LA 22 begins a concurrency with US 51 Bus. opposite Ponchatoula Cemetery and gains a center turning lane for a short distance.  After traveling several blocks on Pine Street through the historic commercial section of town, US 51 Bus. turns off to the south along the CNRR tracks.  East of Ponchatoula, LA 22 resumes as a two-lane highway through the thick pine woods for  before crossing into St. Tammany Parish at Bedico.  During this stretch, the highway crosses the Tangipahoa River and intersects LA 445, another connection to I-12.

St. Tammany Parish

Curving slightly to the southeast, LA 22 heads into the small town of Madisonville, where it becomes known as Mulberry Street.  The route crosses LA 21 and LA 1077 at a four-way intersection with Main Street, which leads north toward Covington and south alongside the Tchefuncte River to the shore of Lake Pontchartrain and the Lake Pontchartrain Basin Maritime Museum.  LA 22 crosses the river by way of a second swing bridge, providing views of several upscale houses on the water.  Groves of ancient live oak trees line the roadway as it passes briefly through Fairview-Riverside State Park.  LA 22 then becomes lined with residential subdivisions and commercial shopping strips as it enters the city of Mandeville.  For this stretch, the roadway widens to accommodate an extra travel lane for westbound traffic only, as well as a center turning lane.

A divided four-lane thoroughfare known as West Causeway Approach branches off of LA 22 and provides access to several area schools and more residential subdivisions.  It also acts as a long ramp to the Lake Pontchartrain Causeway, a  toll bridge to the New Orleans area.  LA 22 proceeds about  further to its eastern terminus at a diamond interchange with US 190 and North Causeway Boulevard.  From this interchange, US 190 heads north on a four-lane freeway alignment toward Covington and straight ahead (east) as a four-lane boulevard through Mandeville.  North Causeway Boulevard continues the freeway southward as the main route to the Lake Pontchartrain Causeway.

Route classification and data
LA 22 has several different classifications over the course of its route, as determined by the Louisiana Department of Transportation and Development (La DOTD).  More than half of the route is classified as a rural major collector, including two large portions from Acy to Springfield and from Ponchatoula to Madisonville.  The remainder generally alternates between an urban collector and an urban minor arterial, with the exception of the western portion of the route between Darrow and Sorrento, which is classified as a rural minor collector.

Daily traffic volume in 2013 peaked at 27,200 vehicles through the suburban and commercial corridor between Madisonville and Mandeville. High counts were also reported near the I-10 and I-55 interchanges in Sorrento and Ponchatoula, respectively. The lowest numbers occurred along the lightly populated stretch in Livingston Parish southwest of Killian with 1,700 vehicles daily.

The entirety of LA 22 from Sorrento to Ponchatoula is part of the Southern Swamps Byway in the state-designated system of tourist routes known as the Louisiana Scenic Byways.

History
In the original Louisiana Highway system in use between 1921 and 1955, LA 22 was part of five shorter routes: State Route 761 from Darrow through Burnside; State Route 54 through Sorrento; State Route 160 to Springfield; State Route 122 to Madisonville; and State Route 465 to Mandeville.

These highways were joined together under the single designation of LA 22 when the Louisiana Department of Highways renumbered the state highway system in 1955.

With the 1955 renumbering, the state highway department initially categorized all routes into three classes: "A" (primary), "B" (secondary), and "C" (farm-to-market).  This system has since been updated and replaced by a more specific functional classification system.

As the above description indicates, the route initially had different termini.  On its western end, LA 22 once crossed the Mississippi River by ferry between Darrow and Donaldsonville and continued along what is now LA 18 to its junction with LA 1.  However, the ferry service was discontinued in 1966 after the Sunshine Bridge was completed just downriver from Donaldsonville.  On its eastern end, LA 22 originally terminated in Ponchatoula since the highway extending from there to Mandeville was temporarily part of US 190 at the time of the 1955 renumbering.  When US 190 was returned to its regular route through Covington the following year, LA 22 was extended to its current terminus at Chinchuba, an area now within the Mandeville city limits.  The actual terminus was a simple Y-intersection at what is now LA 3228 (Asbury Drive) until the present diamond interchange aligned with North Causeway Boulevard was constructed in 1981.

Several small realignments to the roadway over the years have resulted from the replacement of bridges across three rivers in Livingston Parish.  The first was a new bridge across the Natalbany River at Springfield in 1956.  About this same time, two 90-degree turns were eliminated as the route was straightened coming into town from the south.  In 1974, the current Amite River span was constructed, and most recently, the Tickfaw River bridge was replaced in 2000.  In all three cases, portions of the original bridge approaches survive as dead-end local roads, although the bridges themselves have been removed.  The only other significant realignment to LA 22 occurred in 1990 when Sorrento's Main Street was bypassed by a new four-lane alignment (John Leblanc Boulevard) that facilitated traffic between I-10 and US 61.  This included the construction of a twin-span bridge across a small waterway known as Bayou Conway.

Future
Under this plan of "right-sizing" the state highway system, two portions of LA 22 are proposed for deletion as they no longer meet a significant interurban travel function. These consist of the westernmost section of the route between Darrow and LA 70 in Sorrento and the section between LA 16 and Killian.

Major intersections

See also

Notes

References

External links

Maps / GIS Data Homepage, Louisiana Department of Transportation and Development
Southern Swamps Byway at Louisiana Scenic Byways

0022
Transportation in Ascension Parish, Louisiana
Transportation in Livingston Parish, Louisiana
Transportation in Tangipahoa Parish, Louisiana
Transportation in St. Tammany Parish, Louisiana